Shades of white are colors that differ only slightly from pure white.  Variations of white include what are commonly termed off-white colors, which may be considered part of a neutral color scheme or yellow that looks like brown.

In color theory, a shade is a pure color mixed with black (or having a lower lightness). Strictly speaking, a "shade of white" would be a neutral grey.  This article is also about off-white colors that vary from pure white in hue, and in chroma (also called saturation, or intensity).

Colors often considered "shades of white" include cream, eggshell, ivory, Navajo white, and vanilla.  Even the lighting of a room, however, can cause a pure white to be perceived as off-white.

Off-white colors were pervasively paired with beiges in the 1930s, and especially popular again from roughly 1955 to 1975. In terms of paint, off-white paints are now becoming more popular, with Benjamin Moore having 152 shades of off-whites, Behr having 167, and PPG has 315.

Whiteness measures the degree to which a surface is white in colorimetry.

Web colors
Below is a chart showing the computer web color shades of white.  An achromatic white is a white color in which the red, green, and blues codes are exactly equal.  The web colors white and white smoke are achromatic colors. A chromatic shade of white is a white color in which the red, green, and blue codes are not exactly equal, but are close to each other, which is what makes it a shade of white.

White

White is a color, the perception of which is evoked by light that stimulates all three types of color sensitive cone cells in the human eye in equal amounts and with high brightness compared to the surroundings. A white visual stimulation will be void of hue and grayness. White is the lightest possible color.

Chalk white

Chalk white is a tint of white resembling the chalk color.

Ghost white

The web color ghost white is a tint of white associated with what the 'creator' of the color imagined the hue of a ghost could be.

There is no evidence that this color name was in use before the X11 color names were formulated in 1987.

White smoke

The web color white smoke is displayed on the left.

There is no evidence that this color name was in use before the X11 color names were formulated in 1987. The color is also known as Cultured Pearl, one of crayon colors issued by Crayola in its 16-pack of Pearl Brite Crayons.

White solid

The web color white solid is displayed on the left.

There is no evidence that this color name was in use before the X11 color names were formulated in 1987. Sometimes also known as Ghost White, the color has marked blue hues, although is otherwise very close to being completely white in the RGB color system.

Baby powder

The Crayola crayon color baby powder was introduced in 1994 as part of its specialty Magic Scent crayon collection.

Snow

The web color snow is displayed at left.

The first recorded use of snow as a color name in English was in 1000.

The color snow was included as one of the X11 colors when they were formulated in 1987.

Ivory

Ivory is an off-white color that resembles ivory, the material out of which the teeth and tusks of animals (such as the elephant and the walrus) are made. It has a very slight tint of yellow.

The first recorded use of ivory as a color name in English was in 1385.

The color ivory was included as one of the X11 colors when they were formulated in 1987.

Floral white

The web color floral white is displayed at left.

There is no evidence that this color name was in use before the X11 color names were formulated in 1987.

Seashell

Seashell is an off-white color that resembles some of the very pale pinkish tones that are common in many seashells.

The first recorded use of seashell as a color name in English was in 1926.

In 1987, seashell was included as one of the X11 colors.

Bone white

Bone white is a yellowish-gray shade of white which represents the color of natural, unbleached bones.

Cornsilk

Cornsilk is a color that is a representation of the color of cornsilk.

The first recorded use of cornsilk as a color name in English was in 1927.

In 1987, cornsilk was included as one of the X11 colors.

Old lace

Old lace is a web color that is a very pale yellowish orange that resembles the color of an old lace tablecloth.

It is one of the original X11 colors.

Old lace is used as a color of a certain kind of Caucasian skin type in art.

Cream

Cream is a color that is a representation of the color of the cream produced from the milk of cattle.

The first recorded use of cream as a color name in English was in 1590.

In 1987, cream was included as one of the X11 colors.

Beige

The color beige is displayed at left.

The first recorded use of beige as a color name in English was in 1887.

The term originates from beige cloth, a cotton fabric left undyed in its natural color. 

Items that are of beige color in real world applications are typically closer to brown than they are to white.

Parchment

Displayed at left is the color parchment.

In 2001, this was made into one of the colors on the Xona.com color list.

Antique white

Antique white is a web color.

The color name antique white began to be used in 1987 when the X11 colors were first formulated.

Champagne

The color champagne is displayed at left.

The color's name is derived from the typical color of the beverage champagne.

The first recorded use of champagne as a color name in English was in 1915.

Eggshell

The color eggshell is displayed at left.

The color eggshell is a representation of the average color of chicken eggs.

Dutch white

Displayed at left is the color Dutch white.

Dutch white is one of the colors on the Resene Color List, a color list popular in Australia and New Zealand.  The color Dutch white was formulated in 2000.

Bone

The color bone is displayed at left.  This color is a representation of the color of bones.

The first recorded use of bone as a color name in English was in the first decade of the 19th century (exact year uncertain).

Vanilla

The color vanilla is a rich tint of off-white as well as a medium pale tint of yellow.

The first recorded use of vanilla as a color name in English was in 1925.

Flax

The color flax is displayed at left. 

The first recorded use of flax as a color name in English was in 1915.

Navajo white

Navajo white is a whitish orange color, and derives its name from its similarity to the background color of the Navajo Nation ethnic flag.

In 1987, Navajo white was included as one of the X11 colors.

Alabaster

Displayed at right is the color alabaster. It represents the whitish color of the mineral alabaster.

Alabaster has been used as a color in English since at least 1594 (in Shakespeare's The Rape of Lucrece), but the origin of the RGB coordinates is not known.

See also
 Beige
 Lists of colors
 Shades of black
 Shades of gray

References